Cyphoderus similis is a species of elongate-bodied springtail in the family Paronellidae. It is myrmecophilic and has been found using Solenopsis invicta in a relationship of phoresis.

References

Collembola
Articles created by Qbugbot
Animals described in 1927